Atromitos (Greek: Ατρόμητος, "fearless") may refer to:

 Atromitos F.C., a football team based in Peristeri, Athens, Greece
 Atromitos Piraeus, a football team based in Piraeus, Athens, Greece
 Atromitos Yeroskipou, a football team currently playing in the Cypriot Second Division
 Atromitos Stadium, a multi-purpose stadium in Peristeri, Athens, Greece